During the advent of World War II, the U.S. Navy turned to liberal arts colleges to provide a basic education for their recruits. Between July 1, 1943, and June 30, 1946, more than 125,000 individuals were enrolled in the V-12 Navy College Training Program which was offered in 131 colleges and universities throughout the United States. The purpose of the V-12 program was to grant bachelor's degrees to future officers from both the U.S. Navy and the Marine Corps.

States in alphabetical order

Individual programs at each college varied and included Line units (which were the majority and therefore not indicated), Dental units, Medical units and Theological units. Some colleges were host to more than one type of unit.

Alabama

Howard College
University of Alabama School of Medicine – Medical unit

Arizona

Arizona State Teachers College

Arkansas

Arkansas A & M College
University of Arkansas College of Medicine – Medical unit

California

California Institute of Technology
College of Physicians and Surgeons (San Francisco) – Dental unit
College of Medical Evangelists – Medical unit
College of the Pacific
Occidental College
Stanford University School of Medicine – Medical unit
University of California, Berkeley Baptist Divinity School – Theological unit
University of California, Los Angeles
University of Redlands
University of Southern California

Colorado

Colorado College
University of Colorado

Connecticut

Hartford Theological School – Theological unit
Trinity College
Wesleyan University
Yale University
Yale University School of Medicine – Medical unit

Florida

University of Miami

Georgia

Columbia Theological Seminary – Theological unit
Emory University
Emory University School of Medicine – Medical/Dental unit
Georgia Institute of Technology
Mercer University
University of Georgia School of Medicine – Medical unit

Idaho

University of Idaho – Southern Branch

Illinois

Chicago Theological Seminary – Theological unit
Garrett Biblical Institute – Theological unit
Illinois Institute of Technology
Illinois State Normal University
Loyola University - Stritch School of Medicine – Medical/Dental unit
McCormick Theological Seminary – Theological unit
Northwestern University
Northwestern University School of Medicine – Medical unit
University of Chicago
University of Chicago Divinity School – Theological unit
University of Chicago School of Medicine – Medical unit
University of Illinois
University of Illinois College of Medicine – Medical/Dental unit

Indiana

DePauw University
Indiana State Teachers College
Indiana University School of Dentistry – Dental unit
Indiana University School of Medicine, Indianapolis – Medical unit
Purdue University
University of Notre Dame
Wabash College

Iowa

Dubuque Theological Seminary – Theological unit
Iowa State College
Saint Ambrose College
University of Dubuque

Kansas

Bethany College
Kansas State Teachers College
University of Kansas
University of Kansas School of Medicine – Medical unit
Washburn Municipal University

Kentucky

Berea College
Murray State Teachers College
University of Louisville
University of Louisville School of Medicine – Medical/Dental unit

Louisiana

Louisiana Polytechnic Institute
Louisiana State University – Medical unit
Southwestern Louisiana Institute
Tulane University
Tulane University School of Medicine – Medical unit

Maine

Bates College

Maryland

Johns Hopkins School of Medicine - Medical unit
Mount Saint Mary's College
University of Maryland College of Medicine - Medical/Dental unit

Massachusetts

Andover Newton Theological School - Theological unit
Boston University School of Medicine - Medical unit
College of the Holy Cross
Episcopal Theological School - Theological unit
Harvard University
Harvard Divinity School - Theological unit
Massachusetts Institute of Technology
Tufts College
Williams College
Worcester Polytechnic Institute

Michigan

Alma College
Central Michigan University
University of Detroit School of Dentistry - Dental unit
University of Michigan
University of Michigan Medical College - Medical unit
Wayne State University School of Medicine - Medical unit
Western Michigan College

Minnesota

College of St. Thomas
Gustavus Adolphus College
Luther Theological Seminary - Theological unit
St. Mary's College
University of Minnesota
University of Minnesota Medical School - Dental unit

Mississippi

Millsaps College
Mississippi College
University of Mississippi School of Medicine - Medical unit

Missouri

Central College
Central Missouri State Teachers College
Missouri Valley College
Northwest Missouri State Teachers College
Park College
Saint Louis University School of Dentistry - Dental unit
Saint Louis University School of Medicine - Medical unit
Southeast Missouri State Teachers College
University of Missouri–Kansas City School of Dentistry - Dental unit
University of Missouri, School of Basic Medical Science - Medical unit
Washington University School of Medicine - Medical unit
Washington University School of Dental Medicine - Dental unit
Westminster College

Montana

Carroll College
Montana School of Mines

Nebraska

Creighton University College of Medicine - Medical/Dental unit
Doane College
Nebraska State Teachers College
University of Nebraska College of Medicine - Medical unit

New Hampshire

Dartmouth College

New Jersey

Drew University
Princeton University
Stevens Institute of Technology

New Mexico

University of New Mexico

New York

Albany Medical College - Medical unit
Colgate University
Colgate Rochester Divinity School - Theological unit
Columbia University
Cornell University
Cornell University Medical College - Medical unit
Hobart College
Long Island College of Medicine - Medical unit
New York Medical College - Medical unit
NYU College of Medicine - Medical unit
Rensselaer Polytechnic Institute
St. Lawrence University
University of Buffalo School of Dentistry - Dental unit
University of Buffalo School of Medicine - Medical unit
Syracuse University College of Medicine - Medical unit
University of Rochester
Union College
Webb Institute of Naval Architecture

North Carolina

Duke University
Duke University School of Medicine - Medical unit
University of North Carolina at Chapel Hill
University of North Carolina School of Medicine - Medical unit
Wake Forest College - Bowman Gray School of Medicine - Medical unit

North Dakota

Dickinson State Teachers College
North Dakota State School of Science
University of North Dakota School of Medicine - Medical unit

Ohio

Baldwin Wallace College
Bowling Green State University
Case School of Applied Science
Denison University
John Carroll College
Miami University
Oberlin College
Oberlin Graduate School of Theology - Theological unit
Ohio State University College of Dentistry - Medical unit
Ohio Wesleyan University
University of Cincinnati College of Medicine - Medical unit

Oklahoma

University of Oklahoma
University of Oklahoma College of Medicine - Medical unit

Oregon

North Pacific College of Oregon - Medical/Dental unit
University of Oregon Medical School - Medical unit
Willamette University

Pennsylvania

Bloomsburg University
Bucknell University
Franklin and Marshall College
Hahnemann Medical College - Medical unit
Jefferson Medical College - Medical unit
Lancaster Theological Seminary - Theological unit
Muhlenberg College
Pennsylvania State University
Pittsburgh-Xenia Theological Seminary - Theological unit
Swarthmore College
Temple University School of Medicine - Medical/Dental unit
University of Pennsylvania
University of Pittsburgh School of Dental Medicine - Dental unit
University of Pittsburgh School of Medicine - Medical unit
Ursinus College
Villanova College

Rhode Island

Brown University

South Carolina

Medical College of South Carolina - Medical unit
Newberry College
University of South Carolina

South Dakota

University of South Dakota

Tennessee

Carson-Newman College
Milligan College
University of Tennessee College of Medicine - Medical/Dental unit
University of the South
Vanderbilt University - Theological unit
Vanderbilt University School of Medicine - Medical unit

Texas

Baylor University - Medical/Dental unit
North Texas Agricultural College
Rice Institute
Southern Methodist University - Theological unit
Southwestern Medical Foundation - Medical unit
Southwestern University - Medical unit
Texas Christian University - Theological unit
University of Texas at Austin
University of Texas at Houston - Dental unit

Utah

University of Utah
University of Utah College of Medicine - Medical unit

Vermont

Middlebury College
University of Vermont College of Medicine - Medical unit

Virginia

Emory & Henry College
Hampden-Sydney College
Medical College of Virginia - Medical unit
University of Richmond
University of Virginia

Washington

Gonzaga University
University of Washington
Whitman College

Washington D.C.

George Washington University Medical School - Medical unit
Georgetown University School of Medicine - Medical/Dental unit

West Virginia

Bethany College
West Virginia University

Wisconsin

Lawrence College
Marquette University
Marquette University School of Dentistry - Dental unit
Marquette University School of Medicine - Medical unit
University of Wisconsin

References

History of the United States Navy
United States Navy schools and training